The A9 is the outer western Sydney Bypass connecting Campbelltown to Windsor. It was formerly designated Metroad 9, which was one of Sydney's Metroads.

“A9” is used as a route number designation for the entire length, however the road falls under numerous local names. From Windsor to Campbelltown:
 Macquarie Street
 George Street
 Richmond Road, Bligh Park
 The Northern Road (between Bligh Park and Cambridge Gardens)
 Richmond Road, Cambridge Gardens
 Parker Street
 The Northern Road (between South Penrith and Narellan)
 Narellan Road

The A9 applies to Narellan Road from the Hume Motorway interchange to Camden and the complete stretch of The Northern Road from Camden to Windsor via Penrith. It crosses the Great Western Highway and M4 Western Motorway near Penrith.

The A9 is also the major link between the International Regatta Centre at Cranebrook and the M4 Western Motorway. It was upgraded just before the Sydney 2000 Olympics.

History
The passing of the Main Roads Act of 1924 through the Parliament of New South Wales provided for the declaration of Main Roads, roads partially funded by the State government through the Main Roads Board (later the Department of Main Roads, and eventually Transport for NSW). Main Road No. 154 was declared from the intersection with Hume Highway (today Camden Valley Way) in Narellan, via Bringelly and Luddenham to Llandilo (and continuing northwards to the intersection with Windsor Street in Richmond), Main Road No. 178 was declared between Narellan and Campbelltown, and Main Road No. 184 was declared along Macquarie Street, between Richmond and Windsor Roads, through Windsor, on the same day, 8 August 1929. The alignment between Llandilo and Richmond was later realigned to run to Windsor instead.

The route was allocated part of State Route 69 in 1973, linking  to  via Sydney's western suburbs, along Putty Road, the current A9 route, and Appin Road. It was replaced by Metroad 9 between Windsor and Campbelltown in December 1998, with State Route 69 consequently split into two sections: a northern section along Putty Road connecting Windsor to Singleton, and a southern section along Appin Road connecting Campbelltown to Wollongong via the Princes Motorway.

With the conversion to the newer alphanumeric system in 2013, Metroad 9 was replaced by route A9, and the southern section of State Route 69 (Appin Road) was replaced by route B69; the northern section of State Route 69 (Putty Road) was left unallocated.

Road upgrade

As part of the Western Sydney Infrastructure Plan,  of The Northern Road will be upgraded to a minimum of four lanes between The Old Northern Road at Narellan and Jamison Road at South Penrith. The project is being delivered in six stages, with the first stage at Oran Park completed in April 2018. In April 2020, The Northern Road was also realigned between Mersey Road and Eaton Road at Luddenham, to facilitate the construction of Western Sydney Airport. On 16 July 2020, The Northern Road and Bringelly Road interchange opened including a realignment of The Northern Road. On 13 December 2020, The Northern Road was realigned between Elizabeth Drive and Eaton Road was opened to traffic, bypassing Luddenham. The rest of The Northern Road upgrade was completed through 2021, with the final upgrade opened to traffic in December 2021.

Future replacement

As part of the State Budget 2014–15, the NSW Government announced a $5.5 billion road package for Western Sydney. It includes $4.6 million for planning the M9 Motorway. The preferred corridor for the motorway was expected to be announced later in 2014 before plans are made for reserving land. The corridor is now known as Outer Sydney Orbital.

See also

External links
The Northern Road upgrade – Transport for NSW

References 

Sydney Metroads